The 1981 Cuore Cup was a men's tennis tournament played on indoor carpet courts at the Palazzo dello Sport in Milan, Italy. The event was part WCT Tour which was incorporated into the 1981 Volvo Grand Prix circuit. It was the fourth edition of the tournament and was held from 23 March through 29 March 1981. Second-seeded John McEnroe won his third consecutive singles title at the event and earned $35,000 first-prize money.

Finals

Singles
 John McEnroe defeated  Björn Borg 7–6(7–2), 6–4
 It was McEnroe's 2nd singles title of the year and the 26th of his career.

Doubles
 Brian Gottfried /  Raúl Ramirez defeated  John McEnroe /  Peter Rennert 7–6, 6–3

See also
 Borg–McEnroe rivalry

References

External links
 ITF tournament edition details

Milan
Cuore Cup
Cuore Cup
Milan Indoor